Kampilideva was the second and last king of the short-lived Kampili kingdom. His son, prince Kumara Rama helped him wage endless wars against the Kakatiya dynasty of Warangal, the Hoysala Empire, and the sultan of Delhi, Muhammad bin Tughlaq. Kampilideva and his son Kumara Rama died battling the huge forces of Muhammad bin Tughlaq.

Reign
Kampilideva succeeded his father, Singeya Nayaka III (1280–1300 AD) in 1300 AD. He remained in dispute with the territorial claims of Delhi Sultanate.  His son, prince Kumara Rama, who was an able military leader, helped him wage endless wars against the Kakatiya dynasty of Warangal, the Hoysala Empire, and the sultan of Delhi, Muhammad bin Tughlaq. He is seen as a successful and courageous ruler, who resisted the mighty Delhi Sultanate.

Death
In 1327/1328 CE, the huge armies of Muhammad bin Tughlaq from Northern India attacked the kingdom of Kampilideva, i.e. the Kampili kingdom, which was the one of the last independent Hindu kingdoms in the Indian subcontinent. The women of the royal household committed jauhar,  when it faced a certain defeat.  He and his son, Kumara Rama, died while fighting bravely on the battlefield. They both are remembered today for their courage and bravery, and soon, after this, the great Vijayanagara Empire was founded by the brothers Harihara and Bukka.

References

Vijayanagara Empire
History of Karnataka